Vladyslav Orlov (born 17 May 1995) is a Ukrainian tennis player.

Orlov has a career high ATP singles ranking of 350 achieved on 4 January 2021. He also has a career high ATP doubles ranking of 293 achieved on 3 December 2018.

Orlov represents Ukraine at the Davis Cup, where he has a W/L record of 0–1.

Challenger and Futures/World Tennis Tour Finals

Singles: 15 (8-7)

Davis Cup

Participations: (0–1)

   indicates the outcome of the Davis Cup match followed by the score, date, place of event, the zonal classification and its phase, and the court surface.

References

External links

1995 births
Living people
Ukrainian male tennis players
Sportspeople from Kharkiv
21st-century Ukrainian people